Robert William Weiss (born May 7, 1942) is an American professional basketball coach and former player.

College career
Weiss played college basketball at Penn State University from 1963 to 1965 and averaged 16.3 points per game during his senior season.

College statistics

|-
| align="left" | 1962–63
| align="left" | Penn State
| 20 || - || - || .423 || - || .704 || 4.5 || - || - || - || 15.3
|-
| align="left" | 1963–64
| align="left" | Penn State
| 23 || - || - || .436 || - || .800 || 3.9 || - || - || - || 17.0
|-
| align="left" | 1964–65
| align="left" | Penn State
| 24 || - || - || .420 || - || .769 || 4.8 || - || - || - || 16.4
|- class="sortbottom"
| style="text-align:center;" colspan="2"| Career
| 67 || - || - || .427 || - || .762 || 4.4 || - || - || - || 16.3
|}

Professional career
The NBA's Philadelphia 76ers selected Weiss in the 1965 NBA Draft.  Weiss interspersed his career with the 76ers with a short stint in the Eastern Professional Basketball League, playing for the Wilmington Blue Bombers.  He led the EBL in assists in the 1966–67 season and was named to the EBL All-Star First Team.

Weiss was a member of the 76ers' 1967 championship team, after which he was taken by the Seattle SuperSonics in the 1967 NBA Expansion Draft. Weiss played in the NBA for twelve seasons, including six with the Chicago Bulls.

NBA career statistics

Regular season

|-
| align="left" | 1965–66
| align="left" | Philadelphia
| 7 || - || 4.3 || .333 || - || .000 || 1.0 || 0.6 || - || - || 0.9
|-
| style="text-align:left;background:#afe6ba;" | 1966–67†
| align="left" | Philadelphia
| 6 || - || 4.8 || .500 || - || .400 || 0.5 || 1.7 || - || - || 2.0
|-
| align="left" | 1967–68
| align="left" | Seattle
| 82 || - || 19.7 || .430 || - || .839 || 1.8 || 4.2 || - || - || 9.8
|-
| align="left" | 1968–69
| align="left" | Milwaukee
| 15 || - || 16.1 || .316 || - || .794 || 1.8 || 1.8 || - || - || 6.6
|-
| align="left" | 1968–69
| align="left" | Chicago
| 62 || - || 19.9 || .397 || - || .802 || 2.2 || 2.8 || - || - || 6.6
|-
| align="left" | 1969–70
| align="left" | Chicago
| style="background:#cfecec;" | 82* || - || 31.0 || .427 || - || .842 || 2.8 || 5.8 || - || - || 11.5
|-
| align="left" | 1970–71
| align="left" | Chicago
| 82 || - || 27.3 || .422 || - || .840 || 2.3 || 4.7 || - || - || 9.5
|-
| align="left" | 1971–72
| align="left" | Chicago
| 82 || - || 29.9 || .430 || - || .835 || 2.1 || 4.6 || - || - || 11.3
|-
| align="left" | 1972–73
| align="left" | Chicago
| style="background:#cfecec;" | 82* || - || 25.4 || .426 || - || .841 || 1.8 || 3.6 || - || - || 8.7
|-
| align="left" | 1973–74
| align="left" | Chicago
| 79 || - || 21.6 || .466 || - || .835 || 1.3 || 3.8 || 1.3 || 0.2 || 8.5
|-
| align="left" | 1974–75
| align="left" | Buffalo
| 76 || - || 17.6 || .391 || - || .806 || 1.4 || 3.4 || 1.1 || 0.3 || 3.4
|-
| align="left" | 1975–76
| align="left" | Buffalo
| 66 || - || 15.1 || .486 || - || .729 || 1.0 || 2.3 || 0.7 || 0.2 || 3.2
|-
| align="left" | 1976–77
| align="left" | Washington
| 62 || - || 12.4 || .466 || - || .784 || 1.1 || 2.1 || 0.9 || 0.1 || 2.5
|- class="sortbottom"
| style="text-align:center;" colspan="2"| Career
| 783 || - || 22.1 || .428 || - || .828 || 1.8 || 3.7 || 1.0 || 0.2 || 7.6
|}

Playoffs

|-
| style="text-align:left;background:#afe6ba;" | 1966–67†
| align="left" | Philadelphia
| 1 || - || 4.0 || .667 || - || .000 || 2.0 || 2.0 || - || - || 4.0
|-
| align="left" | 1969–70
| align="left" | Chicago
| 5 || - || 24.2 || .424 || - || .800 || 1.2 || 4.8 || - || - || 11.6
|-
| align="left" | 1970–71
| align="left" | Chicago
| 7 || - || 35.7 || .457 || - || .867 || 2.6 || 8.1 || - || - || 15.7
|-
| align="left" | 1971–72
| align="left" | Chicago
| 4 || - || 29.8 || .490 || - || .875 || 3.3 || 3.0 || - || - || 13.8
|-
| align="left" | 1972–73
| align="left" | Chicago
| 7 || - || 25.0 || .430 || - || .762 || 2.3 || 2.1 || - || - || 12.0
|-
| align="left" | 1973–74
| align="left" | Chicago
| 11 || - || 22.8 || .311 || - || 1.000 || 1.8 || 2.9 || 0.6 || 0.1 || 4.7
|-
| align="left" | 1974–75
| align="left" | Buffalo
| 7 || - || 16.1 || .478 || - || .667 || 1.0 || 2.4 || 0.6 || 0.1 || 4.3
|-
| align="left" | 1975-76
| align="left" | Buffalo
| 7 || - || 5.1 || .375 || - || .667 || 0.6 || 0.4 || 0.3 || 0.0 || 1.1
|-
| align="left" | 1976–77
| align="left" | Washington
| 4 || - || 8.5 || .600 || - || .000 || 0.8 || 0.5 || 0.3 || 0.0 || 1.5
|- class="sortbottom"
| style="text-align:center;" colspan="2"| Career
| 53 || - || 20.8 || .426 || - || .802 || 1.7 || 3.1 || 0.5 || 0.1 || 7.7
|}

Coaching career

NBA
After retiring as a player in 1977, Weiss briefly worked for an investment firm in Anaheim, California. In 1978, he joined the San Diego Clippers as an assistant coach. In 1980, he moved to the Dallas Mavericks, an expansion franchise.

After six years in Dallas, Weiss accepted his first head coaching job in 1986 with the San Antonio Spurs. He coached the Spurs for two seasons, never posting a winning record.  He did, however, lead them to the playoffs in 1988.

After one year as an assistant with the Orlando Magic, Weiss moved to the Atlanta Hawks as head coach. In three seasons, his Hawks teams posted a record of 124–122 and made the playoffs twice.

Weiss left the Hawks in 1993. He spent one year as head coach of the Los Angeles Clippers before joining the SuperSonics as an assistant coach. He served in that post for 12 years under both George Karl and Nate McMillan, going to the NBA Finals in 1996.  He was promoted to head coach in 2005 after McMillan left for the Portland Trail Blazers.  However, Weiss did not last even one season, as the Sonics struggled to a losing record.  After a 13–17 start to the 2005–06 season, his three-year deal was terminated on January 3, 2006 and he was replaced with Bob Hill.

China
In 2008, Weiss went to China to coach the Shanxi Zhongyu Brave Dragons in the Chinese Basketball Association. He also coached for the Shandong Lions.

Return to NBA
In 2012, Weiss joined the Atlanta Hawks' coaching staff. The next year, he became an assistant with the Charlotte Bobcats. In 2017, he was hired by the Denver Nuggets as an assistant coach.

Head coaching record

|- 
| style="text-align:left;"|San Antonio
| style="text-align:left;"|
| 82||28||54|||| style="text-align:center;"|6th in Midwest||—||—||—||—
| style="text-align:center;"|Missed playoffs
|- 
| style="text-align:left;"|San Antonio
| style="text-align:left;"|
| 82||31||51|||| style="text-align:center;"|5th in Midwest||3||0||3||
| style="text-align:center;"|Lost in First Round
|- 
| style="text-align:left;"|Atlanta
| style="text-align:left;"|
| 82||43||39|||| style="text-align:center;"|4th in Central||5||2||3||
| style="text-align:center;"|Lost in First Round
|- 
| style="text-align:left;"|Atlanta
| style="text-align:left;"|
| 82||38||44|||| style="text-align:center;"|5th in Central||—||—||—||—
| style="text-align:center;"|Missed playoffs
|- 
| style="text-align:left;"|Atlanta
| style="text-align:left;"|
| 82||43||39|||| style="text-align:center;"|4th in Central||3||0||3||
| style="text-align:center;"|Lost in First Round
|- 
| style="text-align:left;"|L.A. Clippers
| style="text-align:left;"|
| 82||27||55|||| style="text-align:center;"|7th in Pacific||—||—||—||—
| style="text-align:center;"|Missed playoffs
|- 
| style="text-align:left;"|Seattle
| style="text-align:left;"|
| 30||13||17|||| style="text-align:center;"|(fired)||—||—||—||—
| style="text-align:center;"|—
|- class="sortbottom"
| colspan="2" style="text-align:center;"|Career
| 522||223||299|||| ||11||2||9||||

References

1942 births
Living people
American expatriate basketball people in China
American men's basketball coaches
American men's basketball players
Atlanta Hawks assistant coaches
Atlanta Hawks head coaches
Basketball coaches from Pennsylvania
Basketball players from Pennsylvania
Buffalo Braves assistant coaches
Buffalo Braves players
Charlotte Bobcats assistant coaches
Charlotte Hornets assistant coaches
Chicago Bulls players
Dallas Mavericks assistant coaches
Denver Nuggets assistant coaches
Los Angeles Clippers head coaches
Milwaukee Bucks expansion draft picks
Milwaukee Bucks players
Orlando Magic assistant coaches
Penn State Nittany Lions basketball players
Philadelphia 76ers draft picks
Philadelphia 76ers players
Point guards
San Diego Clippers assistant coaches
San Antonio Spurs head coaches
Seattle SuperSonics assistant coaches
Seattle SuperSonics expansion draft picks
Seattle SuperSonics head coaches
Seattle SuperSonics players
Sportspeople from Easton, Pennsylvania
Washington Bullets players
Wilmington Blue Bombers players